Carmenta auritincta, the Arizona clearwing moth, is a moth of the family Sesiidae. It was described by Engelhardt in 1925. It is known from south-eastern Arizona and northern Mexico.

References

External links
mothphotographersgroup

Sesiidae
Moths described in 1925